Valent Sinković (born 2 August 1988) is a Croatian rower. He is the older brother of rower Martin Sinković with whom he won the gold medal in Men's double sculls at the 2016 Summer Olympics in Rio. He had previously won the silver in the men's quadruple sculls at the 2012 Summer Olympics with his brother, David Šain and Damir Martin.

The Sinković brothers were the first men's double sculls team to go under 6 minutes for their race time.

Sinković followed his brothers, Matija and Martin, into rowing after injury stopped him playing football.  Martin and Valent have been racing together internationally since 2008.  In 2008 they won silver in the double sculls at the under-23s World Championships.  In 2009 they, along with David Šain and Damir Martin, won gold in the quadruple sculls at the under-23 World Championships.

Valent was forced to miss part of the 2015 season with a rib injury, meaning the Sinković brothers missed the European championships.

Personal life
Valent played multiple sports before transitioning fully to rowing. He first began practicing gymnastics at age three. This was soon followed by a brief time in the youth setup of HAVK Mladost, a waterpolo club based in Zagreb. He furthermore spent six years playing as a full-back in the youth setups of NK Zagreb, NK Hrvatski Dragovoljac and NK Lokomotiva. Valent began training rowing at age 12, together with his brothers Martin and Matija, after their mother signed them up for rowing classes.

In 2017 Valent Sinković was married to his partner Antonela, a law student.

Rowing career

European championships
Valent first took part in the European championships in their fourth iteration, held in 2010, with his brothers Martin, as well as with David Šain and Damir Martin in the quadruple sculls category. After the 3/4 of the race was rowed, at 1500 meters, they held the fourth position. Over the course of the next 500 meters, they overtook the German and Ukrainian teams, finishing a second behind the Polish team.

They further took part in the 2012 European Rowing Championships as well, likewise competing in the quadruple sculls category. They held the leading position throughout the race, with 2.21 seconds ahead of the second placed team at 1500 meters, and went finished the race 0.92 seconds ahead of the second placed team. The winning time was 6:14.25.

Together with his brother, he competed in the double sculls category during the 2016 European Rowing Championships. They dominated the final race, holding the leading position from the start, with a 2 second lead after 500 meters, and finishing with a 3.68 second lead. Their winning time was 6:56.52.

In the 2018 European Rowing Championships, Valent competed with his brother Martin in the coxless pair category. They were second best for the first three quarters of the race, before taking over in the last 500 meters and finishing first, with a time of 6:26.42. The two brothers continued competing in the coxless pair in the 2019 European Rowing Championships as well, holding the leading position throughout the race, and finishing first with a time of 6:22.46. He and his brother competed in the coxless pair once again during the 2020 European Rowing Championships, finishing in the second place, behind the Romanian Tudosa/Cozmiuc pair.

Olympic games
Together with David Šain, Damir Martin and his brother, he participated in the 2012 Summer Olympics, in the quadruple sculls. The team had no issue qualifying to the final race, coming into it as favorites. However, the German representatives would hold almost a boat lengths lead in the final race, with the Croatian team just barely winning the silver medal, as the Australians finished close behind.

He would change disciplines during the 2016 Summer Olympics, competing in the double sculls, together with his brother. In the final race of the event, the brothers held a narrow lead over the Lithuanian representatives, who overtook them by the 1500 meter mark. They would in turn overtake the Lithuanian team in the final 500 meters of the race, finishing the race first with a time of 6:50.28, 1.11 seconds ahead of the second placed team. Following this victory, the World Rowing Federation would award them the "Team of the Year" award.

Sinković competed in the 2020 Summer Olympics as well, entering the coxless pair event with his brother Martin. The two of them entered the final race as overwhelming favorites to win the gold medal, with a betting coefficient of 1,03. They won with a time of 6:15.29.

World championships
His first appearance in the world championships came at the 2010 World Rowing Championships, when he competed in the quadruple sculls. The Croatian team won the gold medal, finishing with a time of 6:15.78, 1.26 seconds ahead of the second placed team. In the 2011 World Rowing Championships, he won the sole bronze medal of his career, failing to defend his gold medal from the previous year. The same team competed in the 2013 World Rowing Championships, in the same category, finishing with a time of 5:53.57 and winning the gold medal.

During the 2014 World Rowing Championships, he switched to the double sculls, competing together with his brother. They broke the world record in the qualifying race, managing to cover the distance of 2 kilometers in under six minutes (5:59.72). As of 2021 that world best time still stands. In the final race, they finished first. They competed in the same category in the 2015 World Rowing Championships, once again winning the gold medal.

In the 2017 World Rowing Championships, he competed in the coxless pair for the first time in his career, once again with his brother. The pair finished in the second place, winning the silver medal. The two of them competed in the same category in the 2018 World Rowing Championships. They won the gold medal, finishing with a time of 6:14.96, 1.94 seconds ahead of the second placed team. They defended their gold medal at the 2019 World Rowing Championships, finishing with a time of 6:42.28.

Valent and his brother Martin Sinković competed in the double sculls event of the 2022 World Rowing Championships. They won the gold medal, with a time of 6:07.19, almost a full second ahead of the second placed team.

Competitions

 2016 Summer Olympics – Men's double sculls
 2012 Summer Olympics – Men's quadruple sculls
 2010 World Rowing Championships
 2011 World Rowing Championships
 2013 World Rowing Championships
 2014 World Rowing Championships
 2010 European Rowing Championships
 2012 European Rowing Championships

References

External links
 
 
 
 
 

1988 births
Living people
Croatian male rowers
Sportspeople from Zagreb
Rowers at the 2012 Summer Olympics
Rowers at the 2016 Summer Olympics
Rowers at the 2020 Summer Olympics
Olympic rowers of Croatia
Olympic gold medalists for Croatia
Olympic silver medalists for Croatia
Olympic medalists in rowing
Medalists at the 2012 Summer Olympics
Medalists at the 2016 Summer Olympics
Medalists at the 2020 Summer Olympics
European champions for Croatia
World Rowing Championships medalists for Croatia